This is a list of Hindi films that have either released or scheduled to release in 2023.

Box office collection
The highest-grossing Hindi films released in 2023, by worldwide box office gross revenue, are as follows.

January-March

April–June

July-September

October-December

Notes

References

See also 
 List of Hindi films
 List of Hindi films of 2022

2023
Hindi
2023 in Indian cinema